A88 or A-88 may refer to:

 A88 road, a major road in Scotland, United Kingdom
 A88 autoroute, a major road in Western France
 Dutch Defence, in the Encyclopaedia of Chess Openings
 Exterritorial highway A88 (Breslau — Wien), a never-completed highway of Nazi Germany, crossing the Protectorate of Bohemia and Moravia
 The A88, an Apple iPhone clone manufactured by CECT